Superior High School may refer to any of the following:

Superior Junior/Senior High School (Arizona)
Superior High School (Montana)
Superior High School (Wisconsin)